The lowland longjaw galaxias (Galaxias cobitinis) is a galaxiid of the genus Galaxias, found only in the South Island of New Zealand, in the Kauru River, a tributary of the Kakanui River in north Otago, and in parts of the upper Waitaki catchment. It grows to a length of up to 7 cm.

Lowland longjaw galaxias are slender and elongate, having colouration consisting of spots and indistinct bands of various shades of brown and grey.  The single dorsal and anal fins are about two thirds of the way along the body.  Like all galaxiids it lacks scales and has a thick, leathery skin covered with mucus.  The lower jaw is forward of the upper.

Conservation status 
In 2018 the Department of Conservation classified the lowland longjaw galaxias as Nationally Critical under the New Zealand Threat Classification System. It was judged as meeting the criteria for Nationally Critical threat status as a result of there being a population of less than 250 mature adults. The lowland longjaw galaxias is considered conservation dependent, existing in one location and suffering extreme fluctuations in population.

Notes

References
 
 Dunn, N., & O'Brien, L. (2006). "Gravel burrowing ability in Galaxias cobitinis DOC Research & Development Series 236, Department of Conservation, Wellington.
 
 McDowall, R. M., & Waters, J. M. (2003). "A new species of Galaxias (Teleostei: Galaxiidae) from the Mackenzie Basin, New Zealand" Journal of the Royal Society of New Zealand, 33 (3): 675–691.

External links
 Lowland longjaw galaxias Department of Conservation, Wellington. Retrieved 8 September 2015.
 Lowland Longjaw Galaxias NIWA, 2013. Retrieved 8 September 2015.
 Pham, Lan Lowland longjaw galaxias Galaxias cobitinis intergalaxiid.com, University of Otago. Retrieved 8 September 2015.
 NZ's rarest fish being given a fresh-water start Otago Daily Times, 3 December 2009.

Galaxias
Endangered biota of New Zealand
Endemic freshwater fish of New Zealand
Taxa named by Bob McDowall
Fish described in 2002